Church of Our Lady of Hope  ( Malayalam: പ്രത്യാശമാതാ ദേവാലയം, Cochin Portuguese: Igreja de Nossa Senhora da Esperança ) is a Latin Church parish in the Diocese of Cochin. It is located at Fort Vypin in the island of Vypeen, the point where the Vembanad Lake merges with the Arabian Sea, with Fort Cochin on the other side.

Ministering to Latin Catholics of Malabar, its liturgies are according to the Roman Rite of the Catholic Church. The patron of the church is Our Lady of Hope a form in which Virgin mary is venerated as the patron of Fishermen and navigators, pointing to why the emblem of church is an anchor. It happens to be one of the oldest churches in Kochi, built by the Portuguese in 1605 A.D. It is part of Diocese of Cochin  A significant Anglo Indian population is found within the parish's borders. The church is home to the famous statue of Ecce Homo, meaning 'Behold the man' (Malayalam: കൈകെട്ടിയ  രൂപം ) a statue of our lord in chains and is kept for public veneration on the fourth Sunday of lent every year.

Established in the year 1605, the Parish of Our Lady of Hope, had the fortune to celebrate her quadric-centennial celebrations in the year 2005. The parish has about 455 families and more than 2,100 parishioners. The faithful are grouped into 14 Family Units. Not at all scarce in the number of lay associations, the parish has the fortune to celebrate several feasts every year. With the ideal supervision and active participation of the parochial shepherds and encouraging and inspiring presence of the Congregation of the Canossian Sisters of Charity, the Parish of Our Lady of Hope is moving ahead. Thanks be to God

See also
Archdiocese of Goa
Christianity in India
Roman Catholicism in India
List of Roman Catholic dioceses in India
List of Roman Catholic dioceses (structured_view)-Episcopal Conference of India

References
   www.dioceseofcochin.org - Santa Cruz Basilica 
 https://www.dioceseofcochin.org/parish/our-lady-hope-church-estd-1605
 GCatholic.org
 Catholic Hierarchy
 Catholic Encyclopedia - Diocese of Cochin
 Diocesan directory | www.ucanews.com
 Dioceseofcochin.org

Roman Catholic churches in Kochi
Roman Catholic churches completed in 1605
1605 establishments in India
Portuguese in Kerala
17th-century Roman Catholic church buildings in India